Come from the Shadows is the thirteenth studio album (and fifteenth overall) by Joan Baez, released in 1972.  After recording for the independent label Vanguard for more than a decade, Baez signed with A&M, and attempted to point her career in a slightly more "commercial" direction (though the album still had overtly political overtones).  In addition to her own compositions such as "Prison Trilogy","Love Song to a Stranger", "Myths", and "To Bobby" (addressed to Bob Dylan), Baez included John Lennon's "Imagine", Anna Marly's "Song of the Partisan", and Mimi Fariña's "In the Quiet Morning (for Janis Joplin)".

"In the Quiet Morning" and "Love Song to a Stranger" were released as singles. The album was recorded at Quadrafonic Sound Studios in Nashville. The cover photo features an elderly couple being arrested at an anti-war protest, holding hands and flashing peace signs as they are led away.

The album's liner notes feature a Baez quote: "...In 1972 if you don't fight against a rotten thing you become a part of it."

Critical reception
Noel Coppage from Stereo Review was underwhelmed by the album, finding much of it "merely generally pleasant" and "poorly constructed". Robert Christgau gave Come from the Shadows a "C+" in Creem magazine. He mocked Baez's attempt at populist politics and her cultivated vocabulary, singling out the lyrics to "Myths": "I don't know about The People, but just plain people say 'scattered upon the four winds,' not 'upon the four winds scattered.' Actually they don't say 'scattered upon the four winds' either". AllMusic's William Ruhlmann later gave it three out of five stars.

Track listing
All tracks composed by Joan Baez; except where noted.
"Prison Trilogy (Billy Rose)" - 4:23
"Rainbow Road" (Donnie Fritts, Dan Penn) - 3:03
"Love Song to a Stranger" - 3:55
"Myths" - 3:19
"In the Quiet Morning" (Mimi Fariña) - 2:58
"All the Weary Mothers of the Earth (People's Union #1)" - 3:34
"To Bobby" - 3:53
"Song of Bangladesh" - 4:49
"A Stranger in My Place" (Kenny Rogers, Kin Vassy) - 3:07
"Tumbleweed" (Douglas Van Arsdale) - 3:32
"The Partisan" (Anna Marly, Hy Zaret) - 3:17
"Imagine" (John Lennon) - 3:27

Personnel 

Joan Baez – guitar, vocals
Stuart Basore – steel guitar
David Briggs – keyboards
Kenneth Buttrey – drums
Grady Martin – guitar
Charlie McCoy – harp, guitar
Farrell Morris – percussion
 Weldon Myrick – steel guitar
Norbert Putnam – bass guitar
Glen Spreen – keyboards, string arrangements
Pete Wade – guitar
John "Bucky" Wilkin – guitar

See also 
Wikiquote - Quotes from Come From the Shadows

References

1972 albums
Joan Baez albums
Albums produced by Maynard Solomon
A&M Records albums